The historic Panbari Mosque or Rangamati Mosque is a famous mosque in northeast India and is considered to be the oldest mosque in the Indian state of Assam. The mosque is situated on the National Highway 17, near Panbari and Rangamati, about 25 km east from Dhubri town. This 15th/16th century three-domed mosque also presents an excellent example of great architectural achievements of the Sultanate of Bengal.

Construction

The mosque was believed to have been commissioned by the Sultan of Bengal Alauddin Husain Shah to celebrate the victory of the Conquest of Kamata in 1498. However, the exact details of the mosque's history is uncertain and the possible date of construction spans between 1493 and 1519 AD. On the other hand, there is a less common theory which attributes the mosque's construction to Mir Jumla II, the Mughal governor of Bengal who may have passed through the area during his invasion of Assam in 1662. The eidgah and deep well within the complex is considered to have been constructed during the same time as the mosque. The vast paved courtyard and minaret were constructed later on. 

It is said that the mosque later became surrounded by deep forest, and fell in use. In 1928, a villager caught a glimpse of some minarets from the hills of Rangamati whilst he was collecting some firewood. The news then reached the Nawab of Dhaka who even dispatched a team to investigate the matter, and they returned having confirmed its existence.

Background

During the reign of the Koch rulers Rangamati area was a very prosperous place. It was the frontier post of the Koch rulers. Invading army of Bengal sultans and Mughals also used Rangamati fort. The area, as some believe, was also the headquarters of Alauddin Husain Shah. And this mosque was used as a prayer hall by the Muslim soldiers.

It is said that about 200 years ago, the local people of this place found this mosque in Panbari "Pahar" under the thick foliage. They cleaned this place and started to offer Namaz there. Today, Panbari "Pahar" is known as the holy seat and the mosque is a holy shrine for the people of western Assam. The scenic beauty of the hills with its rich flora, its unique location together with the archeological importance, holds promise of becoming an important tourist spot in India. Of late, a township consisting of brick-plinths, terracotta antiquities as also a hoard of coins have been discovered near the mosque, which have been tentatively attributed to the Mughal regime. About 150 people can pray inside the mosque at a time.

Management

The mosque is run by a local body, Panbari mosque management committee, who appoints the imam and other employees. Various religious services like imamat and leading namaz are performed by the imam. The expenses of the mosque are covered from different kind of donations obtained by the mosque. As the mosque enjoy a special place in the society of western Assam, people donate generously irrespective of religion, caste or creed.

Festivals
During the annual Islamic festivals like Eid ul-Fitr and Eid ul-Adha, this mosque wears a special look. Thousands of people from different parts of the country visit the mosque. Not only the people from India but also from England and Japan visit this place. Normally hundreds of people gather here for the weekly Friday noon Jumu'ah prayers, besides other regular prayers.

Transport
As the mosque is standing on the national highway 17, regular bus services are available from Guwahati, Dhubri and Cooch Behar. The nearest railway station is Fakiragram (30 kilometers) and the nearest airport is the Rupsi Airport (21 kilometers). The mosque is also not far away from the mighty Brahmaputra (8 kilometers).

Government steps
The Archaeological Survey of India, Ministry of Culture has taken some steps to conserve the monuments of this area. However, local people are not happy with the token steps of the government and demand more.

References

External links

 Dhubri District Profile
 https://web.archive.org/web/20120208111140/http://www.indiainfoweb.com/assam/panbari/
 ISLAMIC VOICE, JULY 2000.
 Government of Assam, Official website
 Choudhury, R. D.; HERITAGE OF ARCHITECTURE OF ASSAM – NEED FOR CONSERVATION, National Museum, New Delhi.
 The Archaeological Survey of India, Ministry of Culture.

Bengal Sultanate mosques
Dhubri
Mosques in Assam
Religious buildings and structures completed in 1519